Moesa District, often referred to as Moesano, is a former administrative district in the canton of Graubünden, Switzerland. It had an area of  corresponding to the Val Mesolcina, the valley of the eponymous Moesa River.   It was replaced with the Moesa Region on 1 January 2017 as part of a reorganization of the Canton.

It had a population of 8,125 in 2015.  The official language is Italian.

It consisted of three Kreise (circles) and fourteen municipalities:

Languages
The official language of Moesa is Italian, traditionally  the Western Lombard dialect spoken by the native population.

Mergers and name changes
On 1 January 2015 the former municipalities of Arvigo, Braggio, Selma and Cauco merged to form the new municipality of Calanca.

References

Districts of Graubünden